Dicymbe is a genus of 20 species of canopy trees in the family Fabaceae, within subfamily Detarioideae. It is found throughout the Guyana Shield region and parts of W Amazonia. Certain species within the genus are strongly associated with ectomycorrhizal fungi.

Species accepted by the Plants of the World Online as of February 2021:

Dicymbe altsonii 
Dicymbe amazonica 
Dicymbe arenicola 
Dicymbe bernardii 
Dicymbe corymbosa 
Dicymbe duidae 
Dicymbe fraterna 
Dicymbe froesii 
Dicymbe heteroxylon 
Dicymbe hymenaea 
Dicymbe jenmanii 
Dicymbe mollis 
Dicymbe neblinensis 
Dicymbe paruensis 
Dicymbe pharangophila 
Dicymbe praeruptorum 
Dicymbe puncticulosa 
Dicymbe stipitata 
Dicymbe uaiparuensis 
Dicymbe yutajensis

References

External links
 
 

Detarioideae
Fabaceae genera